The Mexican Secretariat of Public Education (in Spanish Secretaría de Educación Pública, SEP) is a federal government authority with cabinet representation and the responsibility for overseeing the development and implementation of national educational policy and school standards in Mexico. Its headquarters has several buildings distributed throughout the country, but its main offices, initially confined to the Old Dominican Convent of the Holy Incarnation in the oldest borough of Mexico City, have extended to the House of the Marqués de Villamayor, (also known as the Casa de los adelantados de Nueva Galicia, built in 1530), the Old House of don Cristóbal de Oñate, a three-time governor and general captain of New Galicia (also built in 1530), and the Old Royal Customs House (built in 1730–1731). Some of the buildings were decorated with mural paintings by Diego Rivera and other notable exponents of the Mexican muralist movement of the twentieth century, David Alfaro Siqueiros, Raul Anguiano, and Manuel Felguerez.

Secretariat functions

 Creation and maintenance of state public schools in Mexico City, excluding those that are dependents of other dependencies 
 Ensuring all requirements related to preschool, primary, secondary, technical, and normal education (i.e., teacher education) as established by the Constitution of Mexico are observed and completed, and to prescribe the norms to which the incorporation of particular schools in the national educational system should adjust 
 Exercising supervision and vigilance that proceeds in the seminaries that impart education in the Republic, pursuant to Article 3 of the Constitution 
 To systematically organize, administer and enrich the general or specialized libraries that are sustained by the Secretariat or that form part of its dependencies 
 To promote the creation of institutes of scientific and technical research and the establishment of laboratories, observatories, planetariums, and also centers that are required for the development of primary, secondary, moral, technical, and superior education; to orient, in coordination with the appropriate dependencies of the federal government and with the public and private entities, the development of scientific and technological research 
 To confer scholarships so that students of Mexican nationality can do research or complete foreign study programs 
 To re-validate studies and titles, and to concede authorization for the exercise of the capacities that they accredit 
 To formulate the catalog of national historic patrimony 
 To organize, sustain, and administer historic, archaeological and artistic museums, painting galleries and art galleries, to the effect of preserving the integrity, the maintenance, and the conservation of historic and artistic treasures of the cultural patrimony of the country 
 To conserve, protect, and maintain archaeological, historical, and artistic monuments that conform the cultural patrimony of the nation, attending the legal dispositions in these matters 
 To orient the artistic, cultural, recreational, and sport-related activities that are realized by the federal public sector 
 To maintain a national data base of the works protected by copyright and trademarks through disconcerted institutes  
 To regulate sports, the people involved, and the application of their rules in the nation

List of secretaries

Sources

See also 
  (ILCE)

External links 
Official Secretariat of Public Education website
Official site of the President's Cabinet

Education
Education in Mexico
Mexico
Mexico
Buildings and structures in Mexico City
Government agencies established in 1921
1921 establishments in Mexico
Historic center of Mexico City
Neoclassical architecture in Mexico
Education